The Song Remains the Same is the name of several works by rock band Led Zeppelin. It may refer to:

"The Song Remains the Same" (song), the opening track from their 1973 album Houses of the Holy
The Song Remains the Same (film), a concert film taking place during three nights of concerts at Madison Square Garden during the band's 1973 North American Tour
The Song Remains the Same (album), the soundtrack album of the concert film